Antoine Ruel (born 31 October 1979 in Aubervilliers, France) is a professional Magic: The Gathering player. He has reached the top eight at the Pro Tour four times, including a win in Los Angeles in 2005. With eighteen Grand Prix top eights, he is among the most successful Grand Prix players of all time. In 2009, Ruel joined his brother Olivier in the Magic: The Gathering Hall of Fame.

Career 

Born in Aubervilliers, France, Antoine and his brother Olivier started playing Magic in 1994. In the 1999-2000 Pro Tour season, he first began to attract attention in the new teams format alongside his brother and Florent Jeudon. As Phenomène J, they finished eleventh at the first teams Pro Tour in Washington D.C., and followed with a win and Grand Prix Cannes under the name Black Ops. These two finishes qualified the three Frenchmen for a special event called the Magic: The Gathering Team Challenge. The event featured some very prominent players, with seven of the twelve players involved being future members of the Hall of Fame. Black Ops won the event, with Antoine defeating Jon Finkel in the final.

Antoine's first major individual success followed soon after. In September 2000, he won Grand Prix Porto defeating his brother in final. At the 2001 World Championships, Antoine had his first breakthrough at the Pro Tour level with a third-place finish. Although, his next high finish at the Pro Tour would not come until 2004, Antoine would continue to make top eight appearances at the Grand Prix Level. In 2004, he made the finals of Pro Tour San Diego, losing to Nicolai Herzog for whom it was the second Pro Tour win that season. The following year, Antoine won Pro Tour Los Angeles taking out Japanese giants Tsuyoshi Fujita and Kenji Tsumura in the quarter- and semifinals respectively. The semifinal match is known for a well played bluff on the part Antoine. He would then go on to sweep American Billy Moreno in the finals in three games. In 2005, he reached the top eight of Pro Tour Honolulu with his brother, making it the first time that brothers had reached the top eight of an individual Pro Tour together. Antoine would lose the quarterfinals to Craig Jones in what has been described as "the most lopsided match in the history of Pro Tour top eights."

In 2009, Antoine was inducted into the Hall of Fame, alongside Dutch players Frank Karsten and Kamiel Cornelissen.

Accomplishments

Top 8 Appearances

Other accomplishments 
Inducted into the Hall of Fame in 2009

References

Living people
French Magic: The Gathering players
1979 births
People from Aubervilliers